O'Neal House may refer to:

Howard O'Neal Barn, Russell, Arkansas, listed on the National Register of Historic Places in White County, Arkansas 
Abijah O'Neall II House, listed on the National Register of Historic Places in Montgomery County, Indiana
James O'Neal House, Nicholasville, Kentucky, listed on the National Register of Historic Places in Jessamine County, Kentucky
George O'Neal House, Nicholasville, Kentucky, listed on the National Register of Historic Places in Jessamine County, Kentucky

See also
Neal House (disambiguation)
Neale House (disambiguation)